Peripatus swainsonae is a species of velvet worm in the Peripatidae family. Females of this species have 31 to 34 pairs of legs; males have 28 to 30. The type locality is in Jamaica.

References

Onychophorans of tropical America
Onychophoran species
Animals described in 1893